The 1918 Princeton Tigers football team represented Princeton University in the 1918 college football season. The team finished with a 3–0 record under second-year head coach Keene Fitzpatrick, outscoring opponents by a total of 61 to 7 in games against the Navy Pay School, the Government Aero School, and Camp Upton. Princeton quarterback Frank Murrey was selected as a consensus first-team honoree on the 1918 College Football All-America Team.

Schedule

References

Princeton
Princeton Tigers football seasons
College football undefeated seasons
Princeton Tigers football